The Order of Mendi for Bravery is a South African honour, instituted on 30 November 2003.  It was originally called the "Mendi Decoration for Bravery", and was renamed as an order on 22 October 2004. Although this is primarily a civilian honour, there have been a few military awards, including a collective award to the South African Air Force and South African Navy units which rescued the passengers from a sinking ocean liner in 1991, and a collective award to SAAF units which carried out flood relief operations in Mozambique in 2001.

Classes
The order is granted by the president of South Africa, for bravery in saving life or property.  It has three classes:

 Gold (OMBG), for conspicuous bravery.
 Silver (OMBS), for exceptional bravery,
 Bronze (OMBB), for outstanding bravery.

Namesake
The order is named after a World War I troopship, the SS Mendi, which sank after a collision in 1917, with the loss of more than 600 (black) South African troops.

Design
The badge of the order is oval,  On the obverse is an oval African shield, depicting the Mendi with a blue crane bird flying overhead.  Behind the shield are a crossed assegai and knobkierrie (war club), and the whole design is surrounded by a border decorated with lion pawprints.  The reverse displays the Coat of Arms of South Africa.  The ribbon is gold, dotted with outlines of lion pawprints, alternately left and right.

Recipients

2003
 Members of the South African Air Force rescue team involved in the  2000 Mozambique flood – Gold
 Basil February – Gold
 Petros Linda Jabane
 Members of the South African National Defence Force rescue team involved in the 1991 sinking of the Oceanos – Silver
 Sam Nkomo – Silver
 Slabbert Leonard – Silver
 Phila Portia Ndwandwe – Silver

2004
 Richard Barney Lekgotla Molokoane – Gold
 Jimmy Booysen – Silver
 Etienne Gunter

2005
 Solomon Mahlangu – Gold
 Grant Nigel Kirkland – Silver
 Simon John Mthombeni – Bronze
 Sheik Yusuf

2010
 G5 unit, including General Solly Shoke

2011
 Raymond Basil van Staden – Bronze – Van Staden drowned whilst trying to save the life of another person. For his selfless act, Van Staden was posthumously awarded the Order of Mendi for Bravery in Bronze

2014
 Elizabeth Barrett – Bronze – "For her courageous act of selflessness in saving 14 children from a burning house and her continued giving to vulnerable orphans and street children."
 Russell Maphanga – Silver – "For his leadership in times of difficulty and brave contribution in fighting for the rights of workers and liberation of the people of South Africa."
 Indres Naidoo – Silver – "For his excellent contribution in the fight against the unjust laws of apartheid, often at times putting his life in danger to ensure freedom for all South Africans."
 Shirish Nanabhai – Silver – "For his bravery in the struggle against apartheid and resolute determination to realise the dream of a free and democratic South Africa."
 Reggie Vandeyar – Silver – "For his remarkable bravery during the struggle against apartheid and for striving for a free and democratic South Africa."

2015 
 Mpumelelo Washington Bongco – Gold – "For his exceptional contribution in pursuit of equality and universal suffrage in South Africa. He never relented, even when this meant endangering his life in a society where anti-government sentiments were crushed with chilling brutality."
 Joseph Morolong – Silver – "For his excellent contribution to the fight for liberation in South Africa. He endured tremendous personal persecution for the ideal of a democratic and liberated society."
 Caleb Motshabi – Silver – "For his excellent contribution to the fight for the liberation of the people of South Africa. He enabled a safe passage for many young people who went into exile to fight for freedom."
 Eric Mtshali – Silver – "For his excellent contribution to the fight against the oppressive and racist apartheid regime. Despite great risks, he was never deterred from fighting against injustice."
 Jetro Ndlovu – Bronze – "For his excellent contribution to the fight for freedom, equality and democracy in South Africa."

2016 
 Hermanus Gabriel Loots aka James Stuart – Silver – "For his gallant fight against the oppression of the majority of South Africans during the hard times of apartheid injustice."
 Maqashu Leonard Mdingi – Silver – "For his excellent contribution to the liberation struggle and steadfast belief in the equality of all who lived in South Africa."
 Ulysses Modise – Silver – "For his excellent contribution to the struggle for the liberation of the people of South Africa"
 Peter Sello Motau aka Paul Dikeledi – Silver – "For his excellent contribution to the liberation struggle. His selfless sacrifice, bravery and thirst for freedom led to democracy at the ultimate cost of his own life."
 Wilson Ndaliso Boy Ngcayiya aka Bogart Soze – Silver – "For his excellent contribution to the fight for the liberation of this country."
 Joseph “Mpisi” Nduli – Silver – "For his excellent contribution to the fight for the liberation of the people of South Africa. His steadfast belief in the equality of all citizens inspired him to fight fearlessly until democracy was realised."
 Sam Ntuli – Silver – "For his excellent contribution to peace-building during a particularly violent and delicate time in the history of the liberation struggle. He paid the ultimate price for his dedication to peace and freedom."
 Jackie Sedibe – Silver – "For her excellent contribution to the struggle for freedom and courage in joining Umkhonto we Sizwe (MK). She fought for the liberation of our people and selflessly sacrificed her time to ensure that all South Africans live as equals."
 Sizakele Sigxashe – Silver – "For his excellent contribution to the fight against the oppression of the people of South Africa. His bravery and courage of convictions saw him leave his home and loved ones into distant lands to fight for the freedom that is enjoyed today."
 Peter Lesego Tshikare aka Peter Boroko – Silver – "For his selfless contribution to the struggle for the liberation of the people of South Africa. He gallantly joined the armed struggle with the conviction that no one deserved to be treated with indignity"

2019 
 Thapelo Tambani – Silver – "For his selfless act of saving another life, which led to his unfortunate demise."

See also
 South African civil honours

References
 South African Government Gazette No 25799 (2 December 2003)
 South African Government Gazette No 26929 (25 October 2004)

External links
 South African government website
 The Order of Mendi – The Presidency
 South African Medals Website

 
Awards established in 2003
Courage awards
2003 establishments in South Africa